The 1914 Grand National was the 76th renewal of the Grand National horse race that took place at Aintree near Liverpool, England, on 27 March 1914.

Finishing Order

Non-finishers

References

 1914
Grand National
Grand National
20th century in Lancashire